The Millennium Link is one of the biggest engineering projects ever undertaken by British Waterways. The Union Canal and the Forth & Clyde Canal were originally joined by a flight of locks. The Millennium Link project replaced the locks with a boat lift, the Falkirk Wheel.

The project launch was in October 1994, and it received a grant of £32 million from the Millennium Commission; the total cost of the project was £78 million.

Work started in 1999.

Partners in the Millennium Link project
City of Edinburgh Council
East Dunbartonshire Council
Falkirk Council
Glasgow City Council
North Lanarkshire Council
West Dunbartonshire Council
West Lothian Council
Millennium Commission
Millennium Forest for Scotland
British Waterways
Scottish Natural Heritage
Central Scotland Countryside Trust
East of Scotland European Partnership
Strathclyde European Partnership
Scottish Enterprise
Edinburgh Canal Society
Ratho Union Canal Society Association - now defunct
Falkirk and District Canal Society based at Camelon, Falkirk
Paisley Canal and Waterways Society
Scottish Inland Waterways Association
Forth and Clyde Canal Society
Linlithgow Union Canal Society
Seagull Trust
List of waterway societies in the United Kingdom

See also

Canals of the United Kingdom
History of the British canal system
The Helix (Falkirk)

References

External links
 British Waterways Scotland page on the Millennium Link
 Official website, now defunct, but archived by James Gentles
 Official site of the Falkirk Wheel
 Falkirk Helix official website

Canals in Scotland
Buildings and structures celebrating the third millennium